Lepanthes pantomima is a species of orchid that occurs from Mexico (Chiapas) to Central America.

References

pantomima
Flora of Chiapas
Flora of Central America